The canton of Champagne-en-Valromey is a former administrative division in eastern France. It was disbanded following the French canton reorganisation which came into effect in March 2015. It consisted of 14 communes, which joined the canton of Plateau d'Hauteville in 2015. It had 5,115 inhabitants (2012).

The canton comprised 14 communes:

Artemare
Belmont-Luthézieu
Béon
Brénaz
Champagne-en-Valromey
Chavornay
Lochieu
Lompnieu
Ruffieu
Songieu
Sutrieu
Talissieu
Vieu
Virieu-le-Petit

Demographics

See also
Cantons of the Ain department 
Communes of France

References

Former cantons of Ain
2015 disestablishments in France
States and territories disestablished in 2015